Jinseong station is a railway station in South Korea. It is on the Gyeongjeon Line.

Defunct railway stations in South Korea